Stargate is a record producing and songwriting team composed of Tor E. Hermansen (born 14 October 1972) and Mikkel S. Eriksen (born 10 December 1972), based in Los Angeles. The team's genres include R&B, pop and hip hop. Stargate was established in Trondheim, Norway.

Stargate broke into the American recording industry in 2001, with the release of "One Night Stand", by British multi-platinum girl group Mis-Teeq, which peaked within the Top 5 of the Billboard Dance Charts. Stargate and Mis-Teeq had further US chart success together, with the release of "Scandalous". It charted at number 2 on the Billboard Dance Charts, No.11 on the Mainstream Top 40 and number 35 on the Billboard Hot 100.

In 2006, Stargate had their first Hot 100 number 1 single, "So Sick", produced and co-written by the team and performed by Ne-Yo. They have since had 10 songs go to number 1 on the Billboard Hot 100. They also produced and co-wrote Beyoncé's worldwide hit single "Irreplaceable", which topped the Billboard Hot 100 for 10 consecutive weeks and "Firework" for Katy Perry. Throughout their career they have been noted for their extensive work with Rihanna, being responsible for writing and producing "Don't Stop The Music", "Rude Boy", "Only Girl (In The World)", "What's My Name?", "S&M", and "Diamonds", all of which were significant successes.

In 2013, the song "Almost Home" co-produced and interpreted by Mariah Carey for the Walt Disney movie Oz the Great and Powerful, won the 2013 World Music Awards for the World's Best Video.

Formation and early works
Stargate began in 1996 as a song-writing trio in Trondheim, Norway, consisting of Tor Erik Hermansen, Mikkel Storleer Eriksen, and Hallgeir Rustan (born 11 April 1966). When they first met, Hermansen was a talent scout for the Norwegian branch of the record label Warner Music Group, Eriksen owned a studio, and Rustan was a mechanical engineer before becoming involved in music. One of their first successful productions was with Norwegian R&B singer Noora Noor. Her first album "Curious" was produced in their Trondheim studio. Noora Noor was signed to the Norwegian branch of the record label Warner Music Group. "Need You", her main hit from this album, was released throughout Europe and gave Stargate attention from the UK music industry. While in Norway, they ventured into the British market, mostly writing songs for R&B-pop performers. At this time they called the team Stargate, a name specifically established for their projects in the United Kingdom.

The team's initial successes was in the British market. Stargate's first international success came with British pop outfit S Club 7, whose 1999 single "S Club Party" reached No. 2 in Australia and No. 1 in New Zealand. This success was followed with another British pop group, Hear'Say's single "The Way to Your Love", which peaked at No. 1 in the United Kingdom in 2001. The team has also produced many Top 10 hits in the United Kingdom for acts such as Blue, Mis-Teeq and Atomic Kitten, and worked with European acts Javine, Shola Ama, Five, and Samantha Mumba.

The team had been listening to US hits and "trying to measure up". They remixed US hip-hop and R&B songs, adding layers of melody to suit the European radio audience. In the wake of their early successes, the team had to choose whether to remain in Norway or move to pursue their goals: "We knew that to make the records we really wanted to make, we had to go to America." Hermansen and Eriksen chose to produce records in the United States, while Rustan preferred to remain a producer in Norway because he did not want to leave his family behind.

In 2001, Stargate produced and co-wrote songs for US pop singer Mikaila's self-titled debut album. "So in Love With Two", a track from the album, had reached No. 25 on the US Billboard Hot 100, becoming one of the team's earliest co-written singles that appeared on the US charts. It was followed three years later with Mis-Teeq's "Scandalous", which peaked at No. 35 on the Hot 100 and No. 2 in the United Kingdom.

In the spring of 2005, Eriksen and Hermansen settled in New York. Initially, their work was slow until they met singer-songwriter Ne-Yo in a hallway at Sony Music Studios in New York. Ne-Yo, who had been working on his debut album, In My Own Words, decided to collaborate with the team, aware that Stargate produced R&B records. After listening to each other's music, a songwriting session ensued and spawned in its second day the song "So Sick", which later topped the Billboard Hot 100 and ushered Stargate into US pop songwriting.

Notable collaborations
Stargate and Ne-Yo collaborated on the hit single "Unfaithful" for Barbadian singer Rihanna's 2006 album A Girl Like Me. In the same year, Stargate again collaborated with Ne-Yo for the single "Irreplaceable", recorded by US singer Beyoncé. The single topped the Billboard Hot 100 for ten consecutive weeks in 2006–07. Also in 2006, Stargate and Taj Jackson gave US singer-songwriter Lionel Richie with "I Call It Love" his first R&B hit in 10 years.

With the team's contributions to music, Stargate emerged as the No. 1 hot producer on the 2006 Billboard Year End Chart. In the following year, Stargate received a Spellemann (Norwegian Grammy). The team received three awards at the ASCAP Pop Music Awards 2007 in Los Angeles, for the songs "So Sick", "Sexy Love" and "Unfaithful"; and two awards at the ASCAP Rhythm & Soul Awards 2007 for "So Sick" and "Sexy Love". They were named Songwriters of the Year at the 2007 ASCAP/PRS in London, receiving nine awards including Song of the Year for "So Sick".

In 2007, "Beautiful Liar", a duet between Knowles and Colombian singer Shakira, became another hit for Stargate, reaching No. 1 in more than 30 countries including the United Kingdom. The song earned Hermansen and Eriksen the Ivor Novello Award for Best-Selling British song. Although "Beautiful Liar" is chiefly an American song, it includes British songwriters Amanda Ghost and Ian Dench, thus eligible for the award.

At the 2008 ASCAP Pop Music Awards, Hermansen and Eriksen received five awards for most performed songs, including "Irreplaceable" among the top five. Stargate was named Best Hitmakers in Rolling Stone magazine's "Best of Rock 2008". Eriksen and Hermansen received Grammy nominations for five separate songs in six categories for the 2008 Grammy Awards, including Record of the Year for "Irreplaceable", Best R&B Song for "Hate That I Love You" and Best Dance Record for "Don't Stop the Music".

On Ne-Yo's third solo-album, Year of the Gentleman, Stargate produced and co-wrote four songs, among them the singles "Closer" and "Miss Independent", the latter of which had reached No. 1 on the Billboard Hot R&B/Hip-Hop Songs. Stargate received nominations in more than 10 categories for the 2009 Grammy Awards. They won their first Grammy in 2009 in the Best R&B Song category for "Miss Independent", performed by Ne-Yo.

Stargate produced "Black and Yellow" for rapper Wiz Khalifa in 2010, a song that reached No. 1 in the Billboard U.S Charts, and Sean Kingston's "Letting Go". They produced five No. 1 singles for Barbadian recording artist Rihanna namely "Rude Boy", "Only Girl (In the World)", "What's My Name?", "S&M", and "Diamonds". Stargate co-wrote and co-produced Owl City's single "Shooting Star" which was released on the Shooting Star EP on 15 May 2012.

In 2013, the song "Almost Home" co-produced and interpreted by Mariah Carey for the Walt Disney Pictures' film Oz the Great and Powerful, won the 2013 World Music Awards for the World's Best Video.

As a favour, Stargate also produced the song "The Fox (What Does the Fox Say?)" for Norwegian brothers Ylvis. The song was intended as a joke in Ylvis's Norwegian talk show but became an unexpected viral hit with over 900 million views as of December 2019. The video was produced in return for the Ylvis brothers portraying the Stargate duo in a mockumenary.

In 2015, Stargate produced and co-wrote Coldplay's smash single "Adventure of a Lifetime."

Other ventures

Star Roc
Stargate teamed-up with US hip hop mogul Jay-Z to launch the record label StarRoc. The label, which is based at Jay-Z's Roc The Mic studio in Manhattan, will be a 50/50 partnership with the team and Jay-Z's entertainment company Roc Nation. Eriksen and Hermansen's connection with Jay-Z, who was then the CEO of the record label Def Jam, began with the release of "So Sick". They met through Tyran "Ty Ty" Smith, A&R from record label Def Jam and a long-time friend of Jay-Z. The label released one album, the self-titled release from Alexis Jordan in 2011. As of 2016, the website's registration has expired. No posts have been made on the label's Instagram account since mid-2013 and its Twitter postings ceased in March 2014. The current status of the label is unknown.

Steller Songs
In addition to their new venture, Eriksen signed a global co-publishing deal with EMI Music Publishing. According to Music Week, his relationship with EMI will further the publishing company's involvement on Stargate's future projects. Prior to the deal, EMI has been involved with Hermansen's projects for nearly ten years since he signed a deal in 1999. Hermansen and Eriksen will also continue their joint-venture partnership, Stellar Songs, with EMI.

LAAMP
In 2021, Eriksen and Hermansen launched the Los Angeles Academy for Artists and Music Production  (LAAMP), a year long intensive music programme for 45 writers, artists and producers. The programme features mentoring from Ne-Yo, Charli XCX, JetsonMade, Emily Warren and John Cunningham. Jeff Rabhan Chairman of the Clive Davis Institute of Recorded Music, joined the programme as executive director.

Non-musical ventures
Mikkel Eriksen owns part of the Norwegian clothing firm JohnnyLove which they are trying to introduce to the US market. On the US launch party in New York on 12 October 2011 Jay-Z came to show his support and explained to the reporter that he was "a little bit Norwegian, as I am sure you know".

Tor Erik Hermansen owns one third of the award-winning Norwegian St. Lars restaurant in Oslo together with international TV-chef Andreas Viestad and Face2Face-founder Per Meland. Queen Sonja of Norway and the former Norwegian prime minister Jens Stoltenberg are regular guests. The owners have tried to bring some of the ambience from the New York-restaurant The Spotted Pig, owned by Stargate's StarRoc-partner Jay-Z, to the restaurant.

Influences and style
Stargate chiefly produces songs in the genres; R&B, pop, dance-pop, Europop and hip hop music.

Hermansen and Eriksen grew up as R&B and hip hop fanatics in Norwegian suburbs, where most youths listen to Europop and US rock. Their interest in music started in the 1980s with breakdance and rap. Eriksen and Hermansen were raised on pop music, growing up listening to music of 1970s pop group ABBA and Germany-based pop outfit Boney M. In an article by The New York Times, Barry Weiss, president of Jive Records, who had hired Stargate to produce songs, "Those influences lend themselves to them making very melodic pop records, with great hooks and choruses." According to the team, they have always loved US music, citing acts such as Prince, Michael Jackson, Usher, Destiny's Child, and R. Kelly and the English band Depeche Mode as their inspiration. The team also cited producers Antonio "L.A." Reid and Kenneth "Babyface" Edmonds of the 1980s R&B band The Deele, and R&B-pop production team Jimmy Jam and Terry Lewis as their early influences.

In their usual production style, Stargate first creates an instrumental backing track—also common in pop and hip hop productions—from which a collaborator would write lyrics and add vocal melody into. In an interview with About.com, the team stated their style:
We always start out with a musical idea. Great effort goes into creating a solid melodic core. We both play the keyboards and program, but in general Mikkel plays the instruments and controls Pro Tools, while Tor has the executive overlook as well as lyrical input. However, we both are hands on and have no rules or limitations. When we have some killer beats and musical starting points, we hook up with one of our favorite topline writers, who gets cracking on the lyrics and melody. We make sure there's a lot of melody in the track, so it can inspire the writer. Together with the topline writer we work, often tweak and simplify the song, and never quit before we feel we've got a killer hook.

Ben Sisario of The New York Times described Stargate's music as "sugary, lilting R&B in the Michael Jackson vein leavened with the kind of melody-rich European pop that paints everything in bright primary colors ... Their work carries on a tradition of Scandinavian bubble-gum artistry that stretches from Abba to Max Martin". Sisario added that, unlike other's producers in the United States, "Stargate signature is more difficult to detect, because to some degree the duo's style is an adaptable method, not a specific sound". Steve Lunt, an A&R executive at Atlantic Records, pointed out, however, that "if you put a bunch of Stargate songs together you will see the thread running through them".

Critical reception
Critics found some of Stargate's succeeding works a replica of Irreplaceable'''s musical formula. Sheffield commented that, in the song "Tattoo" by Sparks, the team "have no shame about churning out 'Irreplaceable' replicants forever", reprising the acoustic guitar-drum loop formula. The New York Times music critic Kelefa Sanneh deemed it "sounds like a cousin" of "Irreplaceable". The release of R&B singer Chris Brown's 2007 single "With You" produced similar impressions: Sheffield, in his review for Brown's album, noted that "Stargate was just trying to roll out 'Irreplaceable' one more time". Hillary Crosley of Billboard magazine wrote that "With You" "leans a bit too heavily" toward "Irreplaceable". Stylus Magazine also noted that Rihanna's Stargate produced single, "Hate That I Love You" was a rehash of Ne-Yo and Stargate's previous works saying, "Here you've got the 'Sexy Love' drums, the 'Irreplaceable' strum, and a bit of the synth and chorus melody from 'So Sick'... is hardly the new twist all these old bits need to sound fresh."

Discography

Singles
As lead artist

As featured artist

Productions

 Grammy Awards nominations

!
|-
| rowspan="2"| 2008
| "Irreplaceable"
| Record of the Year
| 
| style="text-align:center;" rowspan="7"| 
|-
| "Don't Stop the Music"
| Best Dance/Electronic Recording
| 
|-
| 2009
| Year of the Gentleman| rowspan="3"| Album of the Year
| 
|-
| 2010
| I Am... Sasha Fierce| 
|-
| rowspan="2"| 2011
| Teenage Dream''
| 
|-
| "Only Girl (In the World)"
| rowspan="2"| Best Dance/Electronic Recording
| 
|-
| 2022
| "Hero"
|

Notes

See also 
:Category:Stargate (record producers) songs
:Category:Song recordings produced by Stargate (record producers)

References

External links
 Extensive Interview with Stargate in Sound on Sound magazine by Paul Tingen.

Grammy Award winners
Roc Nation artists
Norwegian record producers
Record production duos
Songwriting teams